Mount Howard is located in the Wallowa region of northeast Oregon. The mountain is home to Wallowa Lake Tramway, the steepest tram in North America. At the top of the mountain, there is a restaurant called the Summit Grill and Alpine Patio.  Mount Howard was named for Civil War general Oliver O. Howard.

The  Mount Howard-East Peak area was designated as a National Natural Landmark in June 2016, in recognition of its botanically diverse montane grassland habitats and populations of endemic and rare plant species.

See also
List of National Natural Landmarks in Oregon

References

External links
 US Forest Service: Mt. Howard Summit

Mountains of Oregon
National Natural Landmarks in Oregon
Landforms of Wallowa County, Oregon
Wallowa–Whitman National Forest